Jon Angelucci (born 12 September 1975) is an Australian association football player.

External links 
 Oz Football profile

1975 births
Living people
Australian soccer players
Australian expatriate soccer players
Expatriate footballers in Malaysia
National Soccer League (Australia) players
Blacktown City FC players
Canberra Cosmos FC players
Marconi Stallions FC players
Parramatta Power players
Sydney United 58 FC players
Australian people of Italian descent
Association football forwards